Victor Gialanella (born October 29, 1949) is an American television soap opera writer. Besides his work in daytime, he wrote the Broadway play Frankenstein in 1981, and served as a story editor for Wavelength in 1997.

Positions held
Days of Our Lives (hired by James E. Reilly)
 Breakdown Writer (1997 - June 19, 2006; February 9, 2012 – August 16, 2012)
 Script Editor/Writer (July 1, 2008 - October 10, 2008)
 Co-Head Writer (April 23, 2008 - June 30, 2008)
 Script Writer (1995-1996)

General Hospital
 Script Writer (1989)

Guiding Light
 Script Writer: 1986 - 1987

One Life to Live
 Associate Head Writer: July 20, 2006 - December 18, 2007

Awards and nominations
Daytime Emmy Award
Nomination, 1997-1999, Best Writing, Days of our Lives
Win, 1986, Best Writing, Guiding Light

Writers Guild of America Award
Nomination, 2001, Best Writing, Days of our Lives
Win, 1999, Best Writing, Days of our Lives

External links

Observer-Reporter

American soap opera writers
American male television writers
Writers Guild of America Award winners
1949 births
Living people